Peter Shelley (born Peter Alexander Southworth, 1942) is a British former pop singer, songwriter, and music business executive.  As a performer in the 1970s, he had UK hits with "Gee Baby" and "Love Me Love My Dog". He also originated the persona of Alvin Stardust, writing, singing and producing the first single released under that name, "My Coo Ca Choo". After another singer, Shane Fenton, took over as Alvin Stardust, Shelley continued to write and produce hit songs for him, including "Jealous Mind" and "You You You". Shelley was also the co-founder of Magnet Records.

Career
Born in London, Shelley entered the UK music industry in 1965, working initially as a song plugger with the music publisher, Chappell & Co. He then joined EMI as personal assistant to their chief songwriter/record producer Norman Newell, his responsibilities covering various aspects of music co-ordination, production and administration. He supervised several minor recording sessions for Newell at EMI's Abbey Road Studios, so learning the basics of record production.
 
He later joined Decca Records as a talent scout, discovering for the label Amen Corner, Ten Years After, and Giles, Giles and Fripp, the nucleus of a band later to be called King Crimson. At Decca, Shelley worked with Dick Rowe and Ivor Raymonde and eventually began to write and produce for the company. He left Decca in 1968 to become an independent writer/producer, working with other writers such as Ben Findon and Marty Wilde. He had several minor European single hits during this period.

In 1973, Shelley co-founded Magnet Records with Michael Levy. Shelley's role was that of director of A&R and Levy's as president/general manager/administrator. Shelley wrote, produced and sang on Magnet's first release, Alvin Stardust's "My Coo Ca Choo", which reached No. 2 in the UK Singles Chart and No. 1 in many other countries including Australia where it became the biggest chart seller of 1974, staying at the top slot for seven weeks.

Having earlier appeared as the original Alvin Stardust on the television show Lift Off with Ayshea, Shelley was surprised when the record went straight into the chart the following week. However, as he had no desire to become his creation, he and Levy agreed that if this act was to become more than just a one hit wonder, then a 'face' was required to be, and perform as Alvin Stardust. Shane Fenton was chosen to fill the role and appeared on Top of the Pops the same week the record entered the Top 30 in November 1973. Shelley then followed up writing and producing a string of hits for Stardust.

As a performer in his own right Shelley had hits with "Gee Baby" and "Love Me Love My Dog". By 1975, Magnet had become one of the UK's most successful independent record labels under Shelley's creative direction. He also helped sign Guys 'n' Dolls and Chris Rea to the label. Shelley was presented with the Ivor Novello Award in 1975 for his services to the UK music industry. However, due to differences between Levy and himself, Shelley resigned from Magnet in late 1975 to pursue an independent career.

During this period, he created the character Robotman, recording and producing an animated, music video of the song "I Wanna Be Your Robotman" (featuring Shelley as the lead vocalist). Shelley eventually showed the character to United Media Syndicate of New York, with whom a joint contract was made to further develop Robotman both as a comic strip and music driven, licensed property. The comic strip Robotman was an immediate success, followed by an appearance in the Macy's Day Parade in 1985 and a one-hour animated television special, Robotman & Friends, featuring Shelley's songs, airing one year later.

Shelley has lived in Canada since the 1980s.  His son, John Southworth, is a Canadian pop singer-songwriter.

Discography

Studio albums

Singles

Notes

References

1942 births
Living people
British male singers
British pop singers
British record producers
British songwriters
A&R people
Ivor Novello Award winners